HNoMS Narvik (pennant number F304) was an  of the Royal Norwegian Navy.

Narvik, the last active ship of the class, was transferred to the Royal Norwegian Navy Museum in Horten in 2007.

References

1965 ships
Ships built in Horten
Oslo-class frigates
Cold War frigates of Norway
Museum ships in Norway